Lawrence Conway Eisenhauer (February 22, 1940 – January 29, 2020) was an American professional football defensive end.  A graduate of Chaminade High School in Mineola, New York, he was a college football standout at Boston College and was one of several Boston-area athletes to join the American Football League (AFL)'s Boston Patriots. He was nicknamed "Wildman" by his Patriot teammates because of his unpredictable antics, such as running out onto Kansas City's snow-covered Municipal Stadium field clad in only his helmet and athletic supporter, hitting his head on metal locker doors or ramming his forearms through locker room walls to motivate himself. Eisenhauer was an AFL All-Star in 1962, 1963, 1964 and 1966, and is a member of the Patriots All-1960s (AFL) Team.

Eisenhauer is in the Boston College Athletic Hall of Fame.

He died on January 29, 2020, aged 79.

See also
 List of American Football League players

References

1940 births
2020 deaths
American football defensive linemen
Boston College Eagles football players
Boston Patriots players
American Football League All-Star players
People from Hicksville, New York
Players of American football from New York (state)
American Football League players
Chaminade High School alumni